Wake Up or wake up is to awake. It may also refer to:

Music

Albums 
 Wake Up (Anthony Neely album) or the title song, 2012
 Wake Up! (The Boo Radleys album), 1995
 Wake Up (BTS album) or the title song, 2014
 Wake Up! (Hazel English album) or the title song, 2020
 Wake Up (Jessica Andersson album) or the title song, 2009
 Wake Up! (John Legend and the Roots album), 2010
 Wake Up (Paige Armstrong album) or the title song, 2009
 Wake Up! (Pope Francis album), 2015
 Wake Up (Shalamar album) or the title song, 1990
 Wake Up (Swoope album), 2012
 Wake Up (The Vamps album) or the title song (see below), 2015
 Wake Up (Youngblood Hawke album), 2013
 Wake Up, by Roy Ayers, 1992

EPs 
 Wake Up (Sway EP), 2013
 Wake Up, by Danyew, 2009
 Wake Up, by the Headlines, 2011
 Wake Up, by Karyn Williams, 2011
 Wake Up, by Open Space, 2007
 Wake Up, by Posthuman, 2018
 Wake Up, by Tikkle Me, 2010
 The Wake Up, by Trinidad James, 2015

Songs
 "Wake Up" (Arcade Fire song), 2005
 "Wake Up" (ClariS song), 2012
 "Wake Up" (Eliot song), 2019
 "Wake Up" (Eskimo Joe song), 2001
 "Wake Up" (Fetty Wap song), 2016
 "Wake Up" (Hilary Duff song), 2005 
 "Wake Up" (The Living End song), 2006
 "Wake Up" (Rage Against the Machine song), 1992
 "Wake Up" (Suicide Silence song), 2009
 "Wake Up!" (Tokyo Ska Paradise Orchestra song), 2014
 "Wake Up" (Travis Scott song), 2019
 "Wake Up" (The Vamps song), 2015
 "Wake Up" (XTC song), 1984
 "Wake Up (Make a Move)", by Lostprophets, 2004
 "Wake Up (Next to You)", by Graham Parker, 1982
 "Wake Up", by Aaradhna from Treble & Reverb, 2012
 "Wake Up", by Alanis Morissette from Jagged Little Pill, 1995
 "Wake Up!!!", by Aldo Nova from Nova's Dream, 1997
 "Wake Up", by Alicia Keys from The Diary of Alicia Keys, 2003
 "Wake Up", by American Hi-Fi from Blood & Lemonade, 2014
 "Wake Up", by Aphrodite's Child from It's Five O'Clock, 1970
 "Wake Up", by Avant from The Letter, 2010
 "Wake Up", by Awolnation from Megalithic Symphony, 2011
 "Wake Up", by Brand Nubian from One for All, 1990
 "Wake Up", by Breed 77 from Insects, 2009
 "Wake Up", by the Chambers Brothers from Love, Peace and Happiness, 1969
 "Wake Up", by the Charlatans from Wonderland, 2001
 "Wake Up", by Chicane from The Best of Chicane: 1996–2008, 2008
 "Wake Up!", by Close Your Eyes from We Will Overcome, 2010
 "Wake Up", by CNBLUE from Code Name Blue, 2012
 "Wake Up", by Coheed and Cambria from Good Apollo, I'm Burning Star IV, Volume One: From Fear Through the Eyes of Madness, 2005
 "Wake Up", by Damageplan from New Found Power, 2004
 "Wake Up", by D1ce, 2019
 "Wake Up!", by the Doors, a poem from the song "Celebration of the Lizard", 1970
 "Wake Up", by Dope from Felons and Revolutionaries, 1999
 "Wake Up", by Dr. Dog from Easy Beat, 2005
 "Wake Up", by Earshot from Letting Go, 2002
 "Wake Up", by EDEN from End Credits, 2015
 "Wake Up", by Emigrate from Emigrate, 2007
 "Wake Up", by Enuff Z'Nuff from 10, 2000
 "Wake Up", by Fergie from The Dutchess, 2006
 "Wake Up", by Framing Hanley from A Promise to Burn, 2010
 "Wake Up", by Funkadelic from America Eats Its Young, 1972
 "Wake Up", by Girls' Generation from Hoot, 2010
 "Wake Up", by Gob from Muertos Vivos, 2007
 "Wake Up", by Hanson from the film soundtrack The Princess Diaries, 2001
 "Wake Up", by Hooverphonic from No More Sweet Music, 2005
 “Wake Up”, by Kayzo and RIOT, 2017
 "Wake Up", by KJ-52 from The Yearbook, 2007
 "Wake Up", by Korn from Issues, 1999
 "Wake Up", by Lil Xan from Total Xanarchy, 2018
 "Wake Up", by Love and Rockets from Love and Rockets, 1989
 "Wake Up", by Mad Season from Above, 1995
 "Wake Up", by Merle Haggard from The Way I Am, 1980
 "Wake Up", by Metro Station from Savior, 2015
 "Wake Up", by Missy Elliott from This Is Not a Test!, 2003
 "Wake Up", by Mr. Big from Actual Size, 2001
 "Wake Up", by the Neville Brothers from Yellow Moon, 1989
 "Wake Up", by NF from Mansion, 2015
 "Wake Up", by Now United, 2020
 "Wake Up", by Oingo Boingo from Good for Your Soul, 1983
 "Wake Up", by Pennywise from the compilation Punk-O-Rama III, 1998
 "Wake Up", by Pepper, 2010
 "Wake Up", by Petit Biscuit, 2018
 "Wake Up", by Pure Essence, 1976
 "Wake Up", by Ringo Starr from Stop and Smell the Roses, 1981
 "Wake Up", by Robots in Disguise, 2010
 "Wake Up", by Run–D.M.C. from Run–D.M.C., 1984
 "Wake Up", by Saga from Sagacity, 2014
 "Wake Up", by Sarah Slean from Day One, 2004
 "Wake Up", by Sibel Redžep, 2011
 "Wake Up", by Skegss, 2020
 "Wake Up", by Slapshock from Project 11-41, 2002
 "Wake Up", by Sliimy from Paint Your Face, 2009
 "Wake Up", by SOiL from Whole, 2013
 "Wake Up", by Story of the Year from The Black Swan, 2008
 "Wake Up", by Teddy Thompson from Teddy Thompson, 2000
 "Wake Up", by Three Days Grace from Three Days Grace, 2003
 "Wake Up", by Thrice from To Be Everywhere Is to Be Nowhere, 2016
 "Wake Up", by Tim Armstrong from A Poet's Life, 2007
 "Wake Up", by Two Door Cinema Club from Beacon, 2012
 "Wake Up", by the Verve Pipe from A Family Album, 2009
 "Wake Up", by the Walkmen from Everyone Who Pretended to Like Me Is Gone, 2002
 "Wake Up", by Woody Guthrie from Nursery Days, 1951
 "Wake Up", by Yoko Ono from It's Alright (I See Rainbows), 1982
 "Wake Up", by Z-Ro from King of da Ghetto, 2001
 "Wake Up (Set Your Sights)", by Uriah Heep from ...Very 'Eavy ...Very 'Umble, 1970
 "Wake Up (The Sleeping Giant)", by Twisted Sister from Love Is for Suckers, 1987

Other 
 Wake Up, a musical by Rainhard Fendrich and Harold Faltermeyer

Television

Series
 Wake Up (TV program), a 2013–2014 Australian breakfast show
 Wake Up (TV series), a 2015 Taiwanese medical drama series

Episodes
 "Wake Up" (Adventure Time), 2014
 "Wake Up" (Agents of S.H.I.E.L.D.), 2017
 "Wake Up" (Supergirl), 2017
 "Wake-Up" (Teletubbies), 1997

See also
 
 Wake-up robot problem, a situation where a robot must localize itself without prior knowledge
 Wake (disambiguation)
 "Wake It Up", a 2008 song by E-40
 Wake Me Up (disambiguation)
 Wake Up Call (disambiguation)
 Waking Up (disambiguation)
 Woke, a term referring to a perceived awareness of issues concerning social justice